Ted Omondi  is a Kenyan rugby player.

Playing career

Clubs
 Taffs Well RFC 
 Racing Métro 92 Paris : 2006-2007
 RCA Cergy-Pontoise : 2007-2009
 Rugby Athlétic Club Angérien : since 2009

Winnings
 Kenya national rugby sevens team at the Paris Sevens 2006.

External links 
  Statistics by itsrugby.com in French

Kenyan rugby union players
Rugby union wings
1984 births
Living people
Male rugby sevens players
Kenyan expatriate rugby union players
Expatriate rugby union players in Wales
Expatriate rugby union players in France
Kenyan expatriate sportspeople in France
Kenyan expatriate sportspeople in Wales